Degeneromyia is a genus of crane fly in the family Limoniidae. There is only one known species.

Distribution
It is endemic to Fiji.

Species
D. thais (Alexander, 1956)

References

Limoniidae
Nematocera genera
Diptera of Asia